Edwin Middleton (1865–1929) was a  film director in the United States.

He worked in theater as part of a stock company from Philadelphia before his film career. In 1891, he was an actor in a production titled Sin and Shadow. In 1906, he is credited with a part in a Broadway production titled Matilda as "Dr. Lamb".

He directed W.C. Fields's film debut in Pool Sharks in 1915. He also directed several shorts with casts that included Bud Ross. He made a series of films for the Gaumont Film Company.

He directed at least three "Cissy" films starring Cissy Fitzgerald. 
He worked for Gaumont Film Company in Jacksonville, Florida.

He was an organizer of the Motion Picture Directors Association of New York.

Filmography

The Dream of a Motion Picture Director (1912)
Lime Kiln Field Day (1913) – The oldest surviving film featuring African American actors
One on Romance (1913)
Because of a Hat (1914), writer
Rip Van Winkle (1914) 
The Flaming Sword (1915)
The Widow Wins (1915)
Leave it to Cissy (1915)
Curling Cissy (1915)
Cissy's Innocent Wink (1915)
The Reformer (1915)
Ethel's Romeos (1915)
Pool Sharks (1915) – The first film appearance of W.C. Fields
Wildfire (1915)
The Haunted Manor (1916)
The Isle of Love (1916)
Flames of Vengeance (1916)
Armadale (1916) – An adaptation of Armadale
Gates of Divorce
The Criminals Thumb (1916)
The Hidden Face (1916)
Gates of Divorce (1916) – A "three-part drama"

References

External links
IMDb page

1865 births
1929 deaths
Film directors from Pennsylvania
Film directors from California
Screenwriters from Pennsylvania
Screenwriters from California
20th-century American screenwriters
Articles containing video clips